Whale Bay may refer to:

 The English name for Walvis Bay in Namibia
 Whale Bay, a surfing venue near Raglan, New Zealand
 Bay of Whales, Antarctica